This is a list of species in the agaric genus Conocybe. Many species may have synonyms with species in the Pholiotina genus due to changes in classifications over the years.

Species 
, Species Fungorum accepted 268 species of Conocybe. The majority of these species are not well known and not often recorded.

 Conocybe aberrans
 Conocybe abjecta
 Conocybe acutoconica
 Conocybe aeruginosa
 Conocybe affinis
 Conocybe africana
 Conocybe alachuana
 Conocybe alba
 Conocybe alboradicans
 Conocybe alkovii
 Conocybe altaica
 Conocybe amazonica
 Conocybe ambigua
 Conocybe ammophila
 Conocybe anthracophila
 Conocybe anthuriae
 Conocybe antipus
 Conocybe apala
 Conocybe aporos
 Conocybe arrhenii
 Conocybe atkinsonii
 Conocybe aurea
 Conocybe australis
 Conocybe austrofilaris
 Conocybe bicolor
 Conocybe bispora
 Conocybe bisporigera
 Conocybe brachypodii
 Conocybe brunnea
 Conocybe brunneidisca
 Conocybe brunneoaurantiaca
 Conocybe brunneola
 Conocybe bulbifera
 Conocybe caeruleobasis
 Conocybe caespitosa
 Conocybe candida
 Conocybe capillaripes
 Conocybe cartilaginipes
 Conocybe cettoiana
 Conocybe confundens
 Conocybe coniferarum
 Conocybe connata
 Conocybe coprophila
 Conocybe corneri
 Conocybe crispa
 Conocybe crispella
 Conocybe curta
 Conocybe cyanopus
 Conocybe cylindracea
 Conocybe cylindrospora
 Conocybe daamsii
 Conocybe deliquescens
 Conocybe dennisii
 Conocybe dentatomarginata
 Conocybe diemii
 Conocybe discorosea
 Conocybe dubia
 Conocybe dumetorum
 Conocybe dunensis
 Conocybe ealaensis
 Conocybe echinata
 Conocybe echinospora
 Conocybe elegans
 Conocybe enderlei
 Conocybe estevei
 Conocybe exannulata
 Conocybe excedens
 Conocybe farinacea
 Conocybe fibrillosipes
 Conocybe filaris
 Conocybe filipes
 Conocybe fimetaria
 Conocybe fimicola
 Conocybe fiorii
 Conocybe flexipes
 Conocybe fracticeps
 Conocybe fragilis
 Conocybe fuscimarginata
 Conocybe gigasperma
 Conocybe glabra
 Conocybe gracilis
 Conocybe graminis
 Conocybe hadrocystis
 Conocybe haglundii
 Conocybe halophila
 Conocybe hausknechtii
 Conocybe hebelomatoides
 Conocybe herbarum
 Conocybe herinkii
 Conocybe hexagonospora
 Conocybe hololeuca
 Conocybe horakii
 Conocybe hornana
 Conocybe huijsmanii
 Conocybe humicola
 Conocybe incarnata
 Conocybe incerta
 Conocybe ingridiae
 Conocybe inocybeoides
 Conocybe inopinata
 Conocybe intermedia
 Conocybe intrusa
 Conocybe izonetae
 Conocybe javanica
 Conocybe juncicola
 Conocybe juniana
 Conocybe karinae
 Conocybe keniensis
 Conocybe khasiensis
 Conocybe lenticulospora
 Conocybe lentispora
 Conocybe leporina
 Conocybe leptospora
 Conocybe leucopus
 Conocybe lirata
 Conocybe lobauensis
 Conocybe locellina
 Conocybe macrocephala
 Conocybe macrorhina
 Conocybe macrorhiza
 Conocybe macrospora
 Conocybe magnispora
 Conocybe mairei
 Conocybe mandshurica
 Conocybe marginata
 Conocybe megalospora
 Conocybe merdaria
 Conocybe mesospora
 Conocybe mexicana
 Conocybe michiganensis
 Conocybe microgranulosa
 Conocybe microrrhiza
 Conocybe microsperma
 Conocybe microspora
 Conocybe minima
 Conocybe minuta
 Conocybe missionum
 Conocybe mitrispora
 Conocybe mixta
 Conocybe mixtus
 Conocybe monikae
 Conocybe morenoi
 Conocybe moseri
 Conocybe murinacea
 Conocybe mutabilis
 Conocybe myosura
 Conocybe naviculospora
 Conocybe nemoralis
 Conocybe neoantipus
 Conocybe nigrescens
 Conocybe nigrodisca
 Conocybe nitrophila
 Conocybe nivea
 Conocybe nodulosospora
 Conocybe novae
 Conocybe obliquopora
 Conocybe obscura
 Conocybe obscurus
 Conocybe ochracea
 Conocybe ochraceodisca
 Conocybe ochraceodiscus
 Conocybe ochroalbida
 Conocybe ochrostriata
 Conocybe oculispora
 Conocybe olivaceopileata
 Conocybe pallidospora
 Conocybe panaeoloides
 Conocybe papillata
 Conocybe parapilosella
 Conocybe parvula
 Conocybe percincta
 Conocybe peronata
 Conocybe peroxydata
 Conocybe phaedropis
 Conocybe pilosella
 Conocybe pinetorum
 Conocybe pinguis
 Conocybe pragensis
 Conocybe praticola
 Conocybe procera
 Conocybe proxima
 Conocybe pseudocrispa
 Conocybe pseudopubescens
 Conocybe pubescens
 Conocybe pulchella
 Conocybe pulchra
 Conocybe punjabensis
 Conocybe pusilla
 Conocybe pygmaeoaffinis
 Conocybe radicans
 Conocybe radicata
 Conocybe raphanaceus
 Conocybe reinwaldii
 Conocybe reticulata
 Conocybe reticulatorugosa
 Conocybe rhizophora
 Conocybe rickeniana
 Conocybe rickenii
 Conocybe robertii
 Conocybe romagnesii
 Conocybe roseipes
 Conocybe rostellata
 Conocybe rugispora
 Conocybe rugosa
 Conocybe ruizlealii
 Conocybe sabulicola
 Conocybe semidesertorum
 Conocybe semiglobata
 Conocybe serrata
 Conocybe siennophylla
 Conocybe siliginea
 Conocybe siligineoides
 Conocybe singeriana
 Conocybe solitaria
 Conocybe sonderiana
 Conocybe spartea
 Conocybe spicula
 Conocybe spiculoides
 Conocybe spinulosa
 Conocybe stercoraria
 Conocybe stictospora
 Conocybe striatipes
 Conocybe striipes
 Conocybe subcrispa
 Conocybe subleiospora
 Conocybe subovalis
 Conocybe subpallida
 Conocybe subpubescens
 Conocybe subvelata
 Conocybe subverrucispora
 Conocybe subxerophytica
 Conocybe sulcatipes
 Conocybe tenera
 Conocybe tenerrima
 Conocybe tetraspora
 Conocybe tetrasporoides
 Conocybe thermophila
 Conocybe tortipes
 Conocybe tucumana
 Conocybe turkestanica
 Conocybe tuxtlaensis
 Conocybe typhicola
 Conocybe umbellula
 Conocybe umbonata
 Conocybe uralensis
 Conocybe urticae
 Conocybe utricystidiata
 Conocybe utriformis
 Conocybe vaginata
 Conocybe velata
 Conocybe velutinomarginata
 Conocybe velutipes
 Conocybe verrucispora
 Conocybe vestita
 Conocybe vexans
 Conocybe villosella
 Conocybe vinaceobrunnea
 Conocybe viridibrunnescens
 Conocybe volvata
 Conocybe volvicystidiata
 Conocybe volviornata
 Conocybe volviradicata
 Conocybe watlingii
 Conocybe weema
 Conocybe xerophytica
 Conocybe xylophila
 Conocybe zeylanica
 Conocybe zuccherellii

References 

Conocybe species, List of
Bolbitiaceae